Emily Rose Gray (born October 5, 2000) is an American soccer player who plays as a midfielder for North Carolina Courage of the National Women's Soccer League (NWSL).

Early life 
Gray was raised in the Sewell section of Washington Township, Gloucester County, New Jersey, where she attended Washington Township High School.

Collegiate career 
Gray attended Virginia Tech where she played for the Hokies from 2018 to 2021.

Club career

North Carolina Courage, 2022 
Gray was selected by the North Carolina Courage as the number three overall pick at the 2022 NWSL Draft. She made her debut for North Carolina on April 29, 2022, earning an assist.

References

External links 

 
 

2000 births
Living people
National Women's Soccer League players
American women's soccer players
Soccer players from New Jersey
Women's association football midfielders
North Carolina Courage players
North Carolina Courage draft picks
People from Washington Township, Gloucester County, New Jersey
Sportspeople from Gloucester County, New Jersey
Virginia Tech Hokies women's soccer players
United States women's under-20 international soccer players
Washington Township High School (New Jersey) alumni
Youth Olympic bronze medalists for Canada